Chase County Courthouse may refer to:

Chase County Courthouse (Kansas), Cottonwood Falls, Kansas
Chase County Courthouse (Nebraska), Imperial, Nebraska